The 2020 Iowa Hawkeyes football team represented the University of Iowa during the 2020 NCAA Division I FBS football season. The Hawkeyes played their home games at Kinnick Stadium in Iowa City, Iowa, and competed in the West Division of the Big Ten Conference. They were led by 22nd-year head coach Kirk Ferentz.

On August 11, 2020, the Big Ten Conference canceled all fall sports competitions due to the COVID-19 pandemic. However, on September 16, the Big Ten reinstated the season, announcing an eight-game season beginning on October 24. The Hawkeyes compiled a 6–2 record, all in conference games. The team was set to face Missouri in the Music City Bowl, but the game was canceled after Missouri had to withdraw due to COVID-19 issues.

Junior defensive lineman Daviyon Nixon was named Big Ten Defensive Lineman of the Year, Big Ten Defensive Player of the Year, and was a unanimous First-team All-American.

Previous season
The 2019 Hawkeyes team finished the season 10–3, 6–3 in Big Ten play to finish in third place in the West Division. They received an invitation to the Holiday Bowl where they defeated USC, 49–24.

Schedule
Iowa had games scheduled against Northern Iowa, Iowa State, and Northern Illinois, but canceled these games on July 9 due to the Big Ten Conference's decision to play a conference-only schedule due to the COVID-19 pandemic.

| Michigan and Missouri were canceled due to COVID-19.|

Roster

Rankings 

(*) Big Ten Conference members were not eligible for the Week 2 of the AP and Coaches Polls and Week 3 of the AP due to not having a scheduled season at the time.

Game summaries

at Purdue

Source: Box Score

Northwestern

Source: Box Score

Michigan State

Source: Box Score

Iowa's first win over Michigan State since 2012, and the Hawkeyes' largest in the 48-game series, gave Kirk Ferentz his 163rd win as coach, passing Joe Paterno in total wins as a Big Ten head coach. The Hawkeyes dominated in all three phases of the game and gave Spartan quarterback Rocky Lombardi a long day, intercepting him three times.

at Minnesota

Source: Box Score

Iowa has won eight of the last nine meetings in this series. The Hawkeyes dominated the Golden Gophers, winning for the third straight time in Minneapolis, to keep Floyd of Rosedale in Iowa City for a sixth straight year.

at Penn State

Source: Box Score

Iowa earned their first win over Penn State since 2010, forcing four turnovers in the process. The victory gave Kirk Ferentz his 100th Big Ten win – just the 4th coach in conference history to achieve the feat – and Penn State their first-ever 0–5 start in the program's 134-year history.

Nebraska

Source: Box Score

Iowa was victorious for the sixth straight time – and seventh in eight meetings – against Nebraska. In this back-and-forth game, turnovers in the fourth quarter hurt the Cornhuskers, as they fumbled twice in the last 10:17. The second of which was forced by Chauncey Golston to keep the Heroes Trophy in Iowa City. Senior Keith Duncan kicked four field goals in a game for the fourth time in his career, joining Nate Kaeding as the only Hawkeye kickers to achieve the feat.

at Illinois

Source: Box Score

Iowa hasn't lost to Illinois since 2008. This was their seventh straight victory in the series and have won 12 of the last 13 overall. Illinois jumped out to a 14–0 lead early but the Hawkeyes put up 35 unanswered points and controlled the line of scrimmage from that point on having the ability to both run and pass the ball effectively.

Wisconsin

Iowa won at home over Wisconsin for the first time since 2008 to recapture the bull. After a slow start on the snow-covered field in the first half, the Hawkeyes put up three touchdowns in the second, and were able to stop the Badgers on several fourth down attempts.

Michigan

Iowa was looking to avenge a loss in Ann Arbor from previous season, but it was announced on December 15 the game was canceled due to COVID-19 issues within the Wolverines program. Michigan hasn't won at Kinnick Stadium since 2005.

vs. Missouri (Music City Bowl)

Due to a COVID-19 outbreak within the Tigers' football program, the Music City Bowl was canceled, ending the season for both the Hawkeyes and the Tigers.

Had the game been played, it would have been the first meeting between Iowa and Missouri in a decade. If Iowa had won the game, it would have given Kirk Ferentz his 10th bowl win, which would have tied Joe Paterno for first all-time in Big 10 history.

Awards and honors

Players drafted into the NFL

References

Iowa
Iowa Hawkeyes football seasons
Iowa Hawkeyes football